Modern Love is a 1918 American silent drama film directed by Robert Z. Leonard and starring Mae Murray, Philo McCullough, and Arthur Shirley.

Cast
 Mae Murray as Della Arnold
 Philo McCullough as Julian Lawrence
 Arthur Shirley as George Addison
 Claire Du Brey as Myrtle Harris
 George Chesebro as Wilbur Henderson
 Mrs. A.E. Wright as Mrs. Hall

References

Bibliography
 John T. Weaver. Twenty Years of Silents, 1908-1928. Scarecrow Press, 1971.

External links
 

1918 films
1918 drama films
1910s English-language films
American silent feature films
Silent American drama films
American black-and-white films
Films directed by Robert Z. Leonard
Universal Pictures films
1910s American films